In mathematics, Weisner's method is a method for finding generating functions for special functions using representation theory of Lie groups and Lie algebras, introduced by . It includes Truesdell's method as a special case, and is essentially the same as Rainville's method.

References

Generating functions